(), also known as Korean court cake, is a Korean dessert and a variation of Dragon's beard candy which originated in China. A hard dough of honey-maltose mixture is kneaded, twisted, stretched and pulled into skeins of silky threads, in which assorted candied nuts, chocolate, or other fillings are wrapped. The name  was trademarked in November 7th of 2000 with intent to sell dessert similar to Dragon's beard candy in Korea.

See also 
 List of Korean desserts

References 

Korean desserts
Street food in South Korea